Ruginești is a commune located in Vrancea County, Romania. It is composed of four villages: Anghelești, Copăcești, Ruginești and Văleni.

Natives
 Sava Athanasiu

References

Communes in Vrancea County
Localities in Western Moldavia